Chrysoritis bamptoni is a species of butterfly in the family Lycaenidae. It is endemic to South Africa. It is now mostly considered a subspecies of Chrysoritis thysbe.

Sources
 

Chrysoritis
Endemic butterflies of South Africa
Butterflies described in 1976
Vulnerable animals
Vulnerable biota of Africa